Hush is a 2010 novel written under the pseudonym Eishes Chayil. In August 2011, the author revealed herself as Judy Brown, the daughter of Ruthie Lichtenstein, the publisher of Hamodia. It deals with sexual abuse in the Ger Hasidic Jewish community of Boro Park, Brooklyn, and is based on experiences the author claims to have witnessed. Hush was selected as a Best Book of the Year by Kirkus Reviews.

References

2010 American novels
Works published under a pseudonym
Novels set in Brooklyn
Child sexual abuse in literature
Child sexual abuse scandals in Judaism
Walker Books books